Nevada State Route 51 may refer to:
Nevada State Route 51 (1935), which was renumbered as *SR 93
Nevada State Route 51 (1960s), which existed until the 1970s renumbering